Partial general elections were held in Belgium on 24 May 1914.
The result was a victory for the Catholic Party, which won 41 of the 88 seats up for election in the Chamber of Representatives.

The Catholics had formed the government continuously since 1884; the incumbent de Broqueville government was in office since 1911.

Under the alternating system, elections were only held in four out of the nine provinces: Hainaut, Limburg, Liège and East Flanders. This was the last time this system was applied, as the next elections in 1919 saw the introduction of full four-year terms.

The elections occurred shortly before the outbreak of World War I. The newly elected legislature met for just one day in a special session: on 4 August 1914, when King Albert I addressed the United Chambers of Parliament upon the German invasion of Belgium. The parliament met again after the war in November 1918.

Results

Seats up for election
Seats in the provinces of Antwerp, Brabant, Luxembourg, Namur and West Flanders were not up for election.

Elected members
Apart from the re-elected members, the following six members were newly elected:
Paul Van Hoegaerden-Braconier (liberal), elected in Liège to replace Charles Van Marcke de Lummen (liberal), who did not seek re-election.
Alfred Journez (liberal), elected in Liège to replace Ferdinand Fléchet (liberal), who was not a candidate due to health reasons.
Paul-Emile Janson (liberal), elected in Tournai to replace Albert Asou (liberal), who did not seek re-election to the Chamber.
Paul Neven (liberal), elected in Tongeren-Maaseik to replace Auguste Van Ormelingen (catholic).
Clément Peten (liberal), elected in Hasselt to replace Albert de Menten de Horne (catholic).
Joseph Wauters (socialist), elected in Huy-Waremme to replace Jules Giroul (liberal).

References

Belgium
1910s elections in Belgium
General
Belgium